Don Foreman was an Australian botanist who worked on the Monimiaceae and Proteaceae of Australia. He also helped with the editing of selected Flora of Victoria and Flora of Australia Volumes.

Career
After Foreman graduated from the University of New England in 1969, he took up a position as Forest Botanist at Lae in Papua New Guinea from 1969 to 1975.
On his return to Australia he took on a Master of Science at University of New England and then followed on with his PhD.
Foreman worked at the National Herbarium of Victoria from 1984 to 1998 in various roles; Botanist, Senior Botanist, Collections Manager and Editor of Muelleria. 
Foreman did a stint as the Australian Botanical Liaison Officer at the Royal Botanic Gardens, Kew from September 1996 to August 1997. Foreman's work finished at the National Herbarium of Victoria at the end of 1997. Foreman was an Honorary Associate at the National Herbarium of Victoria from 2000 to 2004.

During Foreman's career he collected extensively in Papua New Guinea and Australia. The majority of Foreman's collections can be found at MEL and CANB, with collections also lodged in AD, ATH, BRI, HO, K, L, LAE, NE, NSW and PERTH.

Standard author abbreviation

Selected published names
Helicia polyosmoides Foreman

APNI

IPNI

 See also :Category:Taxa named by Don Foreman

Selected publications

MSc Thesis
Foreman, D.B. (1976). A taxonomic study of the genus Helicia Lour. (Proteaceae) in New Guinea and Australia with notes on origin, distribution and ecology. MSc thesis, University of New England, Armidale, New South Wales.

Books edited

Flora of Australia
Editorial Assistant Volume 1, Introduction, Edition 2
Editorial Assistant Volume 43, Poaceae 1
Editorial Assistant Volume 44B, Poaceae 3

Flora of Victoria
Co-Editor
Volume 1, Introduction
Contributor
Volume 3, Winteraceae to Myrtaceae

Book Chapters or Contributions
Foreman, D.B. (1972). Timber, commercial species, in Encyclopaedia of Papua New Guinea ed. P. Ryan, Melbourne University Press/University of Papua New Guinea, pp. 1124–1131
Foreman, D.B. (1976). A nut tree from New Guinea – Finschia, West Australian Nut Growing Yearbook pp. 26–31.
Foreman, D.B. (1978). Myristicaceae in Handbooks of the Flora of Papua New Guinea, ed. J.S. Womersley, vol. 1: 175–215. Melbourne University Press.
Foreman, D.B. (1978). Corynocarpaceae in Handbooks of the Flora of Papua New Guinea, ed. J.S. Womersley, vol. 1: 111–113. Melbourne University Press.
Foreman, D.B. (1990). Contributions on Flora conservation, Proteaceae, Rainforests and Flora and Vegetation, in The Penguin Australian Encyclopedia, ed. S. Dawson, O’Neil Publishing.
Foreman, D.B. & Walsh, N.G. eds (1993). Flora of Victoria, vol. 1, Introduction, Inkata Press, Melbourne, pp. 1–320.
Foreman, D.B. (1995). Proteaceae in Handbooks to the Flora of Papua New Guinea, vol. 3, ed. B.J. Conn, pp. 221–270. Melbourne University Press, Carlton.
Foreman, D.B. (1995). Petrophile (Proteaceae), Flora of Australia, vol. 16, pp. 149–193. CSIRO publishing, Melbourne.
Foreman, D.B. (1995). Isopogon (Proteaceae), Flora of Australia, vol. 16, pp. 194–223. CSIRO publishing, Melbourne.
Foreman, D.B. (1995). Stenocarpus (Proteaceae), Flora of Australia, vol. 16, pp. 363–369. CSIRO publishing, Melbourne.
Foreman, D.B. & Hyland, B.P.M. (1995). Buckinghamia (Proteaceae), Flora of Australia, vol. 16, pp. 371–374. CSIRO publishing, Melbourne.
Foreman, D.B. (1995). Opisthiolepis (Proteaceae), Flora of Australia, vol. 16, pp. 373–374. CSIRO publishing, Melbourne.
Foreman, D.B. (1995). Helicia (Proteaceae), Flora of Australia, vol. 16, pp. 393–399. CSIRO publishing, Melbourne.
Foreman, D.B. (1995). Xylomelum (Proteaceae), Flora of Australia, vol. 16, pp. 399–403. CSIRO publishing, Melbourne.
Foreman, D.B. (1995). Triunia (Proteaceae), Flora of Australia, vol. 16, pp. 404–407. CSIRO publishing, Melbourne.
Foreman, D.B. (1995). Floydia (Proteaceae), Flora of Australia, vol. 16, pp. 417–419. CSIRO publishing, Melbourne.
Foreman, D.B. (1997). Monimiaceae in Flora of Victoria vol. 3, eds N.G. Walsh & T.J. Entwisle, pp. 25, 26. Inkata Press, Melbourne.
Foreman, D.B. (1997). Eupomatiaceae in Flora of Victoria vol. 3, eds N.G. Walsh & T.J. Entwisle, pp. 23, 24. Inkata Press, Melbourne.

Journal articles
Foreman, D.B. (1971). A checklist of the vascular plants of Bougainville with descriptions of some common forest trees. Botany Bulletin 5, Dept of Forests, Lae, PNG
Foreman, D.B. (1974). Notes on Myristica Gronov. (Myristicaceae) from Papuasia, Contrib. Herb. Austral-iense. 9: 35–44
Foreman, D.B. (1977). Notes on Basisperma lanceolata C.T. White (Myrtaceae), Brunonia 1: 95–101.
Foreman, D.B. (1983). A review of the genus Helicia in Australia, Brunonia 6: 59–72.
Prakash, N., Foreman, D.B. & Griffiths, S.J. (1984). Floral morphology and gametogenesis in Golbulimima belgraveana (Himantandraceae), Aust. J. Bot. 32: 605–612.
Foreman, D.B. (1985). Seven new species of Helicia Lour. (Proteaceae) from Papua New Guinea, Muelleria 6: 79–91.
Foreman, D.B. (1985). The Helicia genus, Australian Plants 13: 226–230.
Foreman, D.B. (1986). A new species of Helicia, new combination and lecotypification in Triunia (Proteaceae) from Australia, Muelleria 6: 193–196.
Foreman, D.B. (1987). New species of Xylomelum Sm. and Triunia Johnson & Briggs (Proteaceae) Muelleria 6: 299–305.
Foreman, D.B. & Sampson, F.B. (1987). Pollen morphology of Palmeria scandens and Wilkiea huegeliana (Monimiaceae), Grana 26: 127–133.
Foreman, D.B. (1988). Wood anatomy of Idiospermum australiense (Diels) S.T. Blake, Proc. Ecologicial Soc. of Australia 15: 281.
Foreman, D.B. (1988). Notes from the National Herbarium of Victoria – 7: Studies in Isopogon and Petrophile (Proteaceae), Vict. Naturalist 105: 74–80.
Foreman, D.B. & Hyland, B.P.M. (1988). New species of Buckinghamia F. Muell. and Stenocarpus R. Br. (Proteaceae) from northern Queensland, Muelleria 6: 417–424.
Sampson, F.B. & Foreman, D.B. (1988). Pollen morphology of Atherosperma, Daphnandra and Doryphora (Atherospermatacae [Monimiaceae]), Grana 27: 17–25.
Foreman, D.B. (1990). New species of Petrophile R. Br. (Proteaceae) from Western Australia, Muelleria 7: 301–310.
Sampson, F.B. & Foreman, D.B. (1990). Pollen morphology of Peumus boldus (Monimiaceae) – a comparison with Palmeria scandens, Grana 29: 197–206.
Foreman, D.B. (1996). Petrophile, Conesticks, Australian Plants, vol. 19, no 149, pp. 6–29 & 32.
Foreman, D.B. (1996). Isopogon, Drumsticks, Australian Plants, vol. 19, no 150, pp. 62–78.
Foreman,D.B. (1998). New species of Helicia Lour. (Proteaceae) from the Vogelkop Peninsula, Irian Jaya. Kew Bull. 53: 672–674.
Foreman,D. (1998) A personal tribute to Emeritus Professor Noel Charles William Beadle, 20 December 1914 to 13 October 1998. Austral. Syst. Bot. Soc. Nsltr. 97: 24–25.
Renner, S.S., Foreman, D.B. & Murray, D. (2000). Timing transarctic disjunctions in the Atherospermataceae (Laurales): evidence from coding and noncoding chloroplast sequences, Systematic Biology 49: 579–591.

Abstracts
Foreman, D.B. (1981) Embryological and anatomical studies in the Monimiaceae/Atherospermataceae and their position in a putatively phylogenetic classification. In XIII International Botanical Congress, Sydney, Australia 21–28 August 1981: Abstracts. Sydney, Australian Academy of Science. 283.

References

1945 births
2004 deaths
Botanists active in Australia
20th-century Australian botanists
21st-century Australian botanists
Academic staff of the University of New England (Australia)
Muelleria (journal) editors
Australian Botanical Liaison Officers